Christodoulou is a surname of Greek origin, the genitive form of the first name Christodoulos ("Servant of Christ").

Adam Christodoulou, British racing driver
Anastasios Christodoulou, Secretary General of the Association of Commonwealth Universities 1980–96, Foundation Secretary of the Open University
Andreas Christodoulou (footballer, born 1934), Cypriot football player
Charlie Christodoulou, soldier and mercenary
Christodoulos Christodoulou, Cypriot economist, lawyer and politician
Christos Christodoulou, Greek basketball player
Daisy Christodoulou, head of education research at the charity Ark
Demetrios Christodoulou, Greek mathematician-physicist
Evangelia Christodoulou, Greek gymnast
Fanis Christodoulou, Greek basketball player
Georgios Christodoulou, international footballer for Cyprus
John Christodoulou (born 1965), Cyprus-born British billionaire property developer
Jon Christos (born John Christodoulou), English singer, pianist, arranger, conductor and radio personality
Maria Christodoulou, Greek synchronized swimmer
Marios Christodoulou, Cypriot football player
Nikos Christodoulou, Greek conductor and composer
Nikolaos Christodoulou, Greek general
Pambos Christodoulou, Cypriot football manager
Petros Christodoulou, Greek economist and banker
Riki Christodoulou, British racing driver
Stanley Christodoulou, South African boxing referee
Lance Christodoulou, American Mining Engineer

See also
Charlie Crist, Governor of Florida, whose surname is derived from 'Christodoulou'

Greek-language surnames
Surnames
Patronymic surnames